Daniel Smith (October 29, 1748June 16, 1818) was a surveyor, an American Revolutionary War patriot, and twice a United States Senator from Tennessee.

Biography
Smith was born October 29, 1748 in Stafford County, Virginia, the son of Henry Smith and Sarah Ann Crosby. He attended the College of William and Mary in Williamsburg, Virginia. Becoming a surveyor, he moved to Augusta County, Virginia, serving as deputy surveyor of the county in 1773. He owned slaves. In Washington, Virginia on June 10 of that same year he married Sarah Michie (30 Jan 1755 - 2 Apr 1831). She was daughter of George and Elizabeth (Michie) Michie.

As a militia officer, he helped defend the Virginia frontier during Dunmore's War and the American Revolution. He became sheriff of Augusta County in 1780 and was commissioned a colonel in the militia, taking part in the later battles of the Revolutionary War, including Guilford Courthouse and Kings Mountain. On October 5, 1781, Smith was appointed "Assistant Deputy Surveyor" in the Southern Department of the Continental Army under Thomas Hutchins.

At the war's end, Smith moved to what is now Sumner County, Tennessee to claim the land grant for his military service. As county surveyor, he surveyed what became the site of the town of Nashville, Tennessee. He was prominent in local affairs and was appointed a brigadier general in the militia. He was a member of the 1789 North Carolina convention which voted to ratify the United States Constitution.  In 1790, President George Washington named him Secretary (chief deputy) of the Southwest Territory. Smith was a member of the convention that wrote the Tennessee State Constitution of 1796, which came into effect with its statehood on June 1, 1796.  Smith prepared the first official map of Tennessee.

Smith was later appointed as United States Senator when Andrew Jackson resigned from that position (for the first time), serving from October 6, 1798 to March 3, 1799.  He was later elected to his own Senate term, serving from March 4, 1805 to March 31, 1809 when he resigned and returned to his Sumner County estate, Rock Castle in Hendersonville, pursuing his agricultural and business interests until his death there, being interred in an adjacent family plot.

Rock Castle State Historic Site is preserved today as an historical landmark and one of the early examples in Middle Tennessee of a plantation.

References

External links

 

1748 births
1818 deaths
People from Stafford County, Virginia
Virginia colonial people
American people of English descent
Democratic-Republican Party United States senators from Tennessee
Southwest Territory officials
American surveyors
American slave owners
College of William & Mary alumni
American militia generals
Virginia militiamen in the American Revolution
United States senators who owned slaves